Patrocinio González Garrido (18 May 1934 – 30 November 2021) was a Mexican politician who served as a Senator and Governor of Chiapas. His father, was Governor of Chiapas from 1977 to 1979.

References

1934 births
2021 deaths
Institutional Revolutionary Party politicians
20th-century Mexican politicians
Members of the Chamber of Deputies (Mexico)
Members of the Senate of the Republic (Mexico)
Presidents of the Senate of the Republic (Mexico)
Governors of Chiapas
Mexican Secretaries of the Interior
Politicians from Chiapas
National Autonomous University of Mexico alumni